Guo Qiqi (born 7 August 1998) is a Chinese rhythmic gymnast. She qualified for the 2020 Summer Olympics, in Women's rhythmic group all-around.

She competed at the 2019 Rhythmic Gymnastics World Championships.

References

External links 
 (L - R) Hu Yuhui, Xu Yanshu, Liu Xin, Huang Zhangjiayang, Guo Qiqi and Hao Ting of China National Rhythmic Gymnastics Team pose for a portrait ahead of the 2020 Tokyo Olympic Games

1998 births
Living people
People from Chongqing
Sportspeople from Chongqing
Chinese rhythmic gymnasts
Gymnasts at the 2020 Summer Olympics
Olympic gymnasts of China
20th-century Chinese women
21st-century Chinese women